The Hussars of the Guard of the Supreme Powers originated as an Active Militia light cavalry squadron raised from Dec. 3rd, 1841. The main function was as a Presidential Escort for Santa Anna. Hussars protected the “supreme powers” held by the president.

References

Santa Anna's Mexican Army 1821-48  By Rene Chartran pg. 18

History of Mexico
Military units and formations of the Mexican–American War
Protective security units
Military units and formations of Mexico